The Horizon class (French: Classe Horizon; Italian: Classe Orizzonte) is a class of air-defence destroyers in service with the French and Italian navies. They are designated as destroyers by the Italians and using NATO classification but are referred to as "frigates" by the French. The programme started as the Common New Generation Frigate (CNGF), a three-nation collaboration between France, the United Kingdom, and Italy to develop a new generation of air-defence warships. Differing national requirements, workshare disagreements and delays led to the UK withdrawing from the project in 1999 to develop the Type 45 destroyer.

The FREMM multipurpose frigate were built using the same company structure as the Horizon project.

Development

France, Italy, and the UK issued a joint requirement in 1992 after the failure of the NATO Frigate Replacement for the 90s (NFR-90) project. In July 1993, the three countries signed a Memorandum of Understanding for a Common New Generation Frigate (CNGF). The ships were to be armed with the Principal Anti Air Missile System (PAAMS). The UK intended to purchase twelve ships to replace its Type 42 destroyers. France was to purchase four to replace its , and Italy would purchase six to replace its  and  ships.

Problems emerged almost immediately. The primary problem was that of differing requirements: France wanted anti-aircraft warfare (AAW) escorts for its aircraft carriers, but only a limited range was necessary due to the self-defence capability of the French . Italy too required only close-range capabilities, as in its home waters of the Mediterranean Sea the ships would operate under Italian Air Force cover or escorts for its aircraft carrier . The Royal Navy, however, required more capable ships which could throw a large defensive "bubble" over a fleet operating in hostile areas. The compromise that largely solved this problem was the adoption of a standard radar interface, which allowed France and Italy to install the EMPAR multi-function passive electronically scanned array radar and the UK to install the more capable SAMPSON active electronically scanned array radar—the SAMPSON radar has a higher data rate and an adaptive beam that allows a greater ability to track multiple targets, long-range detection of low-RCS targets, a lower false-alarm rate, and overall higher tracking accuracy.

In March 1996, it was agreed that the PAAMS office would be based in Paris, and the Project Horizon project office would be based in London. The latter was to be responsible for the design of the ship, its command and control, and secondary weapons systems. Britain also agreed to contribute £100m in recognition of the development work already completed by Italy and France on PAAMS. Construction would be carried out by DCN (France), GEC-Marconi (UK), and Orizzonte (Italy).

UK withdrawal
On 26 April 1999, the UK announced that it was withdrawing from the CNGF project to pursue its own national design. At this point, the CNGF project was five years behind schedule. The Financial Times summarised the main disagreements between the partner countries: 

Vessel size - As noted above, the UK's requirements were out of step with the those of France and Italy. An agreement was reached but the Financial Times reported that the issue "never entirely [went] away."
Capability - The UK wanted the ships with a wide-area defence capability due to its experience in the Falklands War. 
Industrial structure - The UK tried to use its larger requirement to exert influence; the UK's desire to see Marconi appointed as prime contractor was accepted by France, but only in return for DCN being given the role as prime contractor for the combat management system. The UK, which wished to see a British Aerospace-led consortium given this role, would not accept this.

The resulting Type 45 destroyer is armed with the PAAMS missile system and has benefited from investment in the Horizon project.

Franco-Italian project

France and Italy continued their collaboration under the Horizon project. In September 2000, the two countries signed a contract to jointly produce four ships, ordering two ships each which would deploy the PAAMS missile system. Andrea Doria was accepted on 22 December 2007 and received the flag of the Italian Navy. Full operation capability was achieved in the summer of 2008. The project cost France €2.16bn (~US$3bn) at 2009 prices. France bought 40 Aster 15 and 80 Aster 30 missiles for their ships. On the Italian units, the three cannons will be upgraded to the 76 mm/62 Super Rapid Multi Feeding David/Strales version with the capacity to use the DART guided projectile in the anti-missile role.

Ships

See also
 
 
 
 
 Type 052D destroyer

References

External links

  Programma Orizzonte – Marina Militare specifications and pictures
  Specification, history and photo of Andrea Doria and Caio Duilio
  The FREMM program for the Italian Navy is now complete

 
Frigate classes
Ship classes of the French Navy
Stealth ships